George Johnstone may refer to:
George Johnstone (footballer, born 1914) (1914–1974), Scottish football goalkeeper, played for Aberdeen, Dunfermline, Raith and Morton
George Johnstone (Australian footballer) (1869–1956), Australian rules footballer
George Johnstone (Royal Navy officer) (1730–1787), British naval officer and member of Parliament
George Johnstone (congressman) (1846–1921), U.S. Representative from South Carolina
George Johnstone (British Army officer), Major General commander 6th Brigade, 4th Infantry Division, Peninsula war
George Johnstone (magician), worked with Harry Blackstone, Sr. and had his own notable career as a magician
George Harcourt Vanden-Bampde-Johnstone, 3rd Baron Derwent (1899–1949), British diplomat and author
George Johnstone (1764–1813), English politician, MP for Aldeburgh 1800–02 and for Hedon 1802–13
George Whitton Johnstone (1849–1901), Scottish artist

See also
George Johnston (disambiguation)
George Johnson (disambiguation)